Ronald William Saddler was an Australian rugby league footballer who played in the 1960s and 1970s. A New South Wales and Australian international representative three-quarter back, he played in Sydney's NSWRFL Premiership for the Eastern Suburbs club.

Originally from Euabalong, New South Wales, and of Wiradjuri descent, Ron first played rugby league for Tweed Heads. Saddler also played for the Sydney club Eastern Suburbs from 1963 to 1964 and 1966–71.

An Aboriginal , Saddler was selected for the 1967/68 Kangaroo Tour, playing in 12 matches, but no tests. Saddler has been allocated Eastern Suburbs player number 529.

He was the first indigenous player to captain New South Wales, six years before Arthur Beetson.

Ron Saddler's former Sydney Roosters teammate Kevin Junee, another 1967–68 Kangaroo, said "Saddler got the nod as the Blues' captain in 1967 because he was respected by teammates and opponents alike".

Upon his retirement from Sydney, he captain-coached Murwillumbah Brothers for a number of years in the 1970s. He resided in the Murwillumbah Area until his death in May 2016.

References

Sources
 Whiticker, Alan & Hudson, Glen (2006) The Encyclopedia of Rugby League Players, Gavin Allen Publishing, Sydney

1942 births
2016 deaths
Australia national rugby league team players
Australian rugby league players
City New South Wales rugby league team players
Country New South Wales rugby league team players
Indigenous Australian rugby league players
New South Wales rugby league team captains
New South Wales rugby league team players
Sydney Roosters players
Sydney Roosters captains
Rugby articles needing expert attention
Rugby league centres
Rugby league players from New South Wales